Transportation Alternatives (TransAlt, formerly T.A.) is a non-profit organization in New York City which works to change New York City's transportation priorities to encourage and increase non-polluting, quiet, city-friendly travel and decrease automobile use. TransAlt seeks a transportation system based on a "Green Transportation Hierarchy" giving preference to modes of travel based on their relative benefits and costs to society. To achieve these goals, T.A. works in five areas: Cycling, Walking and Traffic Calming, Car-Free Parks, Safe Streets and Sustainable Transportation.  Promotional activities include large group bicycle rides.

History 
Transportation Alternatives was founded in 1973 during the explosion of environmental consciousness that also produced the Clean Air Act, Clean Water Act and the National Environmental Policy Act. Since its founding, TransAlt has helped win numerous improvements for cyclists and pedestrians and has become the leading voice for cycling and walking in New York City and a model for livable streets advocacy across the United States. TransAlt's roots are in cycling in New York City, and many of its members are everyday cyclists. A bicycle friendly city means changing the overall transportation system, which, even in New York City where more people use public transit than cars, means shifting a paradigm dominated by the private automobile. The expression/phrase One Less Car was coined and given to TA by Richard Rosenthal around 1981. Since 2014, TransAlt has been at the forefront of monitoring New York City's Vision Zero initiative and advocating for progress in meeting safety goals.

Past successes 
Since its creation, Transportation Alternatives has helped achieve goals including:

A new two-way bike lane on the Brooklyn Bridge
Pedestrian and bicycling paths on all East River Bridges for the first time in 50 years
A complete Hudson River Greenway, eleven miles of car-free walking and cycling along the Hudson River
A promise of a Manhattan Waterfront Greenway, a car-free path circling the entirety of Manhattan
A permanently car-free Prospect Park.  
A permanently car-free Central Park. 
Publication of a 160-page New York City bicycle master plan, The Bicycle Blueprint
Legal bike access on New York City Subway and New Jersey Transit, including 24/7 access to the subway
New Manhattan access to the Brooklyn Bridge promenade and ramped access to the entire path
Pedestrian safety improvements on Queens Boulevard
Pedestrian improvements in Herald Square and Times Square
The Bronx's Safe Routes to School: Pedestrian improvements at 38 Bronx schools
Creation of NYC DOT citywide Safe Schools Program
800 speed bumps on neighborhood streets
Numerous new bike lanes throughout NYC
Bicycle racks on city streets throughout NYC
Legal bicycle access to the George Washington Bridge
Secure bike parking at several midtown garages
Pedestrian and cyclist access to River Road on the New Jersey Palisades
Overturn of a proposed 1987 midtown bicycle ban

Volunteer support 

Transportation Alternatives relies on thousands of volunteers activists to achieve its goals. While many support TransAlt's bike tours, many more help as part of the organization's eight active borough activist committees, representing The Bronx, Brooklyn, Staten Island, Queens, and Manhattan.

Current initiatives 
Transportation Alternatives' current campaigns are numerous. They include:
 Pedestrian safety:  TransAlt is pushing for 20 mph zones in various neighborhoods, as well as more speed limit enforcement.  
 Expanding the bicycle network: encouraging the city to continue their expansion of  bike lanes, particularly on-street protected bike lanes, which have been shown to reduce injuries of all street users, including motorists.  T.A. is also advocating for New York City to implement a robust bike share system, akin to Paris' highly successful Vélib' system.
 Improving bicyclist behavior: TransAlt has distributed tens of thousands of their "Biking Rules" booklets in English, Spanish and Chinese, and has sponsored a Biking Rules PSA Film Festival, among other initiatives.
The Vision Zero Street Design Standard is a plan to planning, designing, and building streets that can save lives.  
Ongoing petition creation for users/members and petition drives.

Events 

Transportation Alternatives produces a number of bike tours throughout the year, including the NYC Century Bike Tour and the Tour de Staten Island.  In addition to fundraising, the purpose of these tours is to introduce New Yorkers to bicycling around the city and to give the confidence and inspiration to take up biking as a regular activity.

TransAlt also puts on a number of other events including the Vision Zero Cities conference, benefits, parties, lectures and other events.

See also 
Cycling in New York City
Copenhagenization (bicycling)

References

External links 
Transportation Alternatives
Biking Rules
Families For Safe Streets
NYC Century Bike Tour
Tour de Staten Island
Tour de Bronx

Cycling in New York City
Transportation in New York City
Public transportation in New York City
Non-profit organizations based in New York City
Organizations established in 1973
1973 establishments in New York City